The National Health Insurance Joint Committee existed from 1911 to 1948.

References

Defunct public bodies of the United Kingdom
Parliamentary committees on Healthcare